Changchukha Dzong is a village in southern Bhutan. It is located in Trongsa District.

Nearby towns and villages include Beteni (8.6 nautical miles), Bhangbarai (8.4 nm), Namtir (12.3 nm), Lamti (16.7 nm), Shemgang (17.1 nm), Bitana (5.7 nm), Maogaon (6.6 nm) and Gongchuandgaon (7.5 nm).

See also 
List of cities, towns and villages in Bhutan

External links
Satellite map at Maplandia.com

Populated places in Bhutan